Eucalyptus racemosa, commonly known as snappy gum or narrow-leaved scribbly gum, is a species of small to medium-sized tree that is endemic to eastern Australia. It has smooth, mottled bark, lance-shaped to curved or egg-shaped adult leaves, flower buds in groups of between seven and fifteen, white flowers and cup-shaped, conical or hemispherical fruit.

Description
It has smooth, mottled white, yellow, grey or cream-coloured bark with insect scribbles. Flowering mainly occurs from July to September and the flowers are white.

Taxonomy
Eucalyptus racemosa was first formally described in 1797 by the botanist Antonio José Cavanilles in his book Icones et Descriptiones Plantarum. The specific epithet (racemosa) is a Latin word meaning "having racemes", which is a misnomer, as it does not have flowers in racemes.

Distribution and habitat
Snappy gum grows in woodland and forest, sometimes in pure stands, on poor sandstone soils in mid to high rainfall areas. It is found  along the coast, tablelands and western slopes from Bombala, Bathurst and Albury in New South Wales to Gympie and Bundaberg in south-eastern Queensland.

Ecology
The distinctive scribbles often found on the bark of this eucalypt are caused by the scribbly gum moth, Ogmograptis racmosa.

Gallery

References 

racemosa
Myrtales of Australia
Flora of New South Wales
Plants described in 1797
Flora of Queensland
Taxa named by Antonio José Cavanilles